Aliabad (also Romanized as ‘Alīābād; also known as Valah Zāqerd, Valazāqard, Valeh Zāqerd, Valz̄āqerd, and Veshzagard) is a village in Dursun Khvajeh Rural District, in the Central District of Nir County, Ardabil Province, Iran. At the 2006 census, its population was 279, in 77 families.

References 

Towns and villages in Nir County